Jack Rockwell Trowbridge (October 6, 1890 – November 10, 1947) was an American film actor who was born in Mexico. He appeared in over 250 movies, mostly Westerns, between 1927 and 1947. 

Rockwell's older brother was character actor Charles Trowbridge. In the 1920s, prior to embarking on a professional career as actor, he worked as a fireman.

His death in 1947 was due to hypostatic pneumonia, not a "nervous breakdown" as claimed on IMDb.

Selected filmography

References

External links
 

1890 births
1947 deaths
American male film actors
Male actors from Veracruz
Burials at Forest Lawn Memorial Park (Hollywood Hills)
20th-century American male actors
Male Western (genre) film actors
Mexican emigrants to the United States